is a private university in Miyamae-ku, Kawasaki, Kanagawa Prefecture, Japan. Established in 1971, it is a medical school affiliated with the Roman Catholic Church. In addition to medical studies, the school offers a degree in comparative religious studies. The school is also the first in Asia to be approved as a medical center for the FIFA world soccer association, and is the medical provider for the Japan national football team.

References

External links
 Official website 

Educational institutions established in 1971
Private universities and colleges in Japan
Universities and colleges in Kanagawa Prefecture
Medical schools in Japan
Catholic universities and colleges in Japan
Kawasaki, Kanagawa
1971 establishments in Japan